Shields Lake is a lake in Rice County, in the U.S. state of Minnesota.

Shields Lake was named for James Shields (1810–1879), an American politician and U.S. Army officer.

References

Lakes of Minnesota
Lakes of Rice County, Minnesota